"Ashes" is a song recorded by Canadian singer Celine Dion for the soundtrack of the 2018 American superhero film Deadpool 2, which is based on the Marvel Comics character Deadpool and distributed by 20th Century Fox. It was written by Petey Martin, Jordan Smith, and Tedd T and produced by Steve Mac with a remix version produced by Steve Aoki.

Director David Leitch wanted to create an original song for Deadpool 2 that could support the emotional core of the film, with "Ashes" being the song that was ultimately written. He and actor-producer Ryan Reynolds asked Dion to record the song, and she agreed to do it. The song is meant to balance a satire of similar songs in other films with its role as the actual emotional through-line of this one. Leitch also directed a music video for the song featuring Dion and Reynolds, as well as dancer Yanis Marshall also portraying Deadpool for sequences in which the character dances around a stage in high heels.

"Ashes" appears in Deadpool 2 over the opening credits of the film, and was released as the lead single for the soundtrack by Columbia Records on May 3, 2018, along with the music video. The song was subsequently released as part of the film's official soundtrack album, Deadpool 2 (Original Motion Picture Soundtrack), on May 18. The remix version of the song was released on May 25. The song was received positively by critics and reached number one on the US Dance Club Songs chart.

Background
During the development process for Deadpool 2, director David Leitch felt that retaining the personal stakes of the first film by focusing on "an existential crisis and a deeply personal cause" for Deadpool was going to be more compelling for audiences than trying to build the film around global stakes. As part of this, Leitch wanted to create an original song for the film that thematically represented these personal stakes and served as an emotional through-line for many of the characters in the film in the vein of "Take My Breath Away" and "My Heart Will Go On"; it plays over the film's James Bond-style opening credits.

Composition and recording
Leitch and music supervisor John Houlihan began meeting with songwriters to discuss the song, with Leitch focusing on conveying his thematic ideas. They "ended up discovering" the song "Ashes" as written by Petey Martin, Jordan Smith, and Tedd T. Leitch felt it "just sort of fit and ticked all the boxes of what I was trying to do, story-wise". Leitch then discussed with actor/producer Ryan Reynolds his wish to find a "contemporary artist who's got the chops to make it super emotional" for recording the song. Reynolds suggested Celine Dion as someone who is both an "incredible singer" and could fit into the subversive Deadpool universe. Reynolds approached Dion about this, and Leitch said that she agreed to join the project not only because her son is a fan of Deadpool but also because she was "taken aback by the song" and understood what they wanted to do with it. Leitch admitted that the song was satirical but also felt that having Dion record it elevated it to play as a more emotional cornerstone of the film as well.

Music video
Leitch and Reynolds both wanted to produce a music video to accompany the song; Leitch was initially conflicted about this, as he wanted audiences to discover the song while watching the film rather than have it be revealed to them during the film's marketing campaign, but he ultimately decided that it was an important part of the film to use in marketing since it is "a central part of the movie". It was particularly important to Leitch and Reynolds that they be involved in the making of the video, rather than simply handing off the idea to a different music video director who did not share their vision for it. Their specific vision focused on having Dion give a sincere performance of the song while subverting that in the classic mold of Deadpool. Because of this, Leitch made time in his schedule to direct the music video himself.

Coming from a background of action, Leitch said it was a dream of his to make a music video. He decided to also involve Jonathan Sela, the cinematographer for Deadpool 2, because of Sela's prolific cinematography work for music videos. Sela was able to aid Leitch with his expertise. The director found similarities between staging the dancing in the video and staging action for his films. The video was filmed in the Colosseum at Caesars Palace, where Dion hosts her Las Vegas residency shows, with choreography by dancer Yanis Marshall. Reynolds had wanted to involve Marshall in the Deadpool films for some time, after Reynolds was introduced by his wife Blake Lively to videos of Marshall dancing in high heels. Marshall spent 12 hours dancing in the Deadpool costume and high heels for the music video and described the costume as a "nightmare" to dance in. Leitch said Reynolds and Dion were "Canadian icons" and found it fun to give the two of them a moment of banter at the end of the video, which the pair came up with together.

Release
"Ashes" was released as a single by Columbia Records on May 3, 2018, along with the music video. On May 7, 2018, the song was sent to the US Adult contemporary radio stations. Columbia then released the full soundtrack for Deadpool 2, featuring "Ashes", on May 18. Dion began performing the song as part of the set list for her Las Vegas show Celine on May 22, 2018. It was also featured during her 2018 Asia-Pacific tour.

Critical response
For the Guardian, Issy Sampson said that looking past the "wackiness" of Deadpool, the song was actually "a stone-cold Céline banger that's begging to be wailed at karaoke five wines in. Fantastique". Nick Johnston of Vanyaland called the song "pretty damn good ... if you're into [Dion's] brand of diva pop" and was positive of its tone being reminiscent of "the kind of '90s tie-in video you'd see airing on MTV in the afternoons". Beth Elderkin at Gizmodo said that the release of the song and music video brought her joy due to the combination of Dion and Deadpool but that the song itself was "surprisingly good" as well.

Brian Kremkau at ReadJunk suggested that the song could be nominated for the Academy Award for Best Original Song and was also positive about the 1990s style of the song and music video. The Music called the song and accompanying video "confusingly inspiring", while NPR Music's Lars Gotrich positively said that Dion was "too good for Deadpool" and that the song "kind of slaps! You know, if a Céline Dion ballad could slap". Writing for Knoxville News, Chuck Campbell praised the song for its earnest effect, while Jonathan Broxton for Movie Music UK also felt that it should be nominated for an Academy Award.

Remixes
After performing alongside Dion at a charity event at Caesars Palace in November 2017, raising money for victims of the 2017 Las Vegas shooting, music producer Steve Aoki created a "tasteful remix" of the song, dubbed a "Deadpool Demix". It was released by Sony Music online on May 25, 2018. Another remix by American producer DJ Riddler was officially approved a month later and released commercially on August 3, 2018.

Charts

"Ashes" topped the US Dance Club Songs, becoming Dion's third leader on the chart, after "Misled" (July 1994) and "Taking Chances" (February 2008). By November 2019, Billboard reported that "Ashes" has already over 64 million on-demand streams in the United States, making it Dion's sixth most streamed song in the country.

Certifications

See also
List of number-one dance singles of 2018 (U.S.)

References

External links
 
 
 

2010s ballads
2018 singles
2018 songs
Celine Dion songs
Columbia Records singles
Deadpool (film series)
Pop ballads
Satirical songs
Song recordings produced by Steve Mac
Songs written by Tedd T
Songs written for films